Ingrid Palmieri (born 12 January 1948) is a Belgian former professional tennis player. She originally competed as Ingrid Loeys, before her marriage to Italian tennis player Sergio Palmieri.

Palmieri, a left-handed player, was Belgian youth champion (18s) in 1966 and represented the Belgium Federation Cup team from 1967 to 1970. She competed in the main draws of the French Open and Wimbledon during her career.

References

External links
 
 
 

1948 births
Living people
Belgian female tennis players
20th-century Belgian women